Bahamut is a giant fish from Arabian mythology.

Bahamut may also refer to:
Bahamut (Dungeons & Dragons), a dragon deity in Dungeons & Dragons
Bahamut (Final Fantasy), a character from the Final Fantasy video game series
Bahamut (band), a heavy metal band from Detroit, Michigan
Bahamut (album), an album by Hazmat Modine, or its title track
Bahamut, an apocalyptic dragon entity from fantasy franchise Rage of Bahamut

See also

Bahmut
Behemoth (disambiguation)